Numerical certification is the process of verifying the correctness of a candidate solution to a system of equations.  In (numerical) computational mathematics, such as numerical algebraic geometry, candidate solutions are computed algorithmically, but there is the possibility that errors have corrupted the candidates.  For instance, in addition to the inexactness of input data and candidate solutions, numerical errors or errors in the discretization of the problem may result in corrupted candidate solutions.  The goal of numerical certification is to provide a certificate which proves which of these candidates are, indeed, approximate solutions.
  
Methods for certification can be divided into two flavors: a priori certification and a posteriori certification.  A posteriori certification confirms the correctness of the final answers (regardless of how they are generated), while a priori certification confirms the correctness of each step of a specific computation.  A typical example of a posteriori certification is Smale's alpha theory, while a typical example of a priori certification is interval arithmetic.

Certificates 

A certificate for a root is a computational proof of the correctness of a candidate solution.  For instance, a certificate may consist of an approximate solution , a region  containing , and a proof that  contains exactly one solution to the system of equations.

In this context, an a priori numerical certificate is a certificate in the sense of correctness in computer science.  On the other hand, an a posteriori numerical certificate operates only on solutions, regardless of how they are computed.  Hence, a posteriori certification is different from algorithmic correctness – for an extreme example, an algorithm could randomly generate candidates and attempt to certify them as approximate roots using a posteriori certification.

A posteriori certification methods 

There are a variety of methods for a posteriori certification, including

Alpha theory 

The cornerstone of Smale's alpha theory is bounding the error for Newton's method.  Smale's 1986 work introduced the quantity , which quantifies the convergence of Newton's method.  More precisely, let  be a system of analytic functions in the variables ,  the derivative operator, and  the Newton operator.  The quantities 

and

are used to certify a candidate solution.  In particular, if 

In other words, if this inequality holds, then there is a root  of  so that iterates of the Newton operator converge as

Interval Newton and Krawczyck methods  

For example, the Newton operator has this property. Suppose that  is a region, then,

There are versions of the following methods over the complex numbers, but both the interval arithmetic and conditions must be adjusted to reflect this case.

Interval Newton method

In the univariate case, Newton's method can be directly generalized to certify a root over an interval.

In practice, any interval containing  can be used in this computation. In other words, . Therefore, .

See interval Newton method for higher dimensional analogues of this approach.

Krawczyck method

This approach is similar to a multivariate version of Newton's method, replacing the derivative with the fixed matrix .

It then follows that 
where the matrix-vector product is computed using interval arithmetic.
where the calculations are, once again, computed using interval arithmetic.

where  is the identity matrix.

In this case, there is a unique root of  if 

Miranda test 

 Miranda test (Yap, Vegter, Sharma)

A priori certification methods 

 Interval arithmetic (Moore, Arb, Mezzarobba)
 Condition numbers (Beltran–Leykin)

Interval arithmetic 

Interval arithmetic can be used to provide an a priori numerical certificate by computing intervals containing unique solutions.  By using intervals instead of plain numeric types during path tracking, resulting candidates are represented by intervals.  The candidate solution-interval is itself the certificate, in the sense that the solution is guaranteed to be inside the interval.

Condition numbers 

Numerical algebraic geometry solves polynomial systems using homotopy continuation and path tracking methods.  By monitoring the condition number for a tracked homotopy at every step, and ensuring that no two solution paths ever intersect, one can compute a numerical certificate along with a solution.  This scheme is called a priori path tracking.

Non-certified numerical path tracking relies on heuristic methods for controlling time step size and precision.  In contrast, a priori certified path tracking goes beyond heuristics to provide step size control that guarantees that for every step along the path, the current point is within the domain of quadratic convergence for the current path.

References

Algebraic geometry
Nonlinear algebra